This is a list of adult nonfiction books that topped The New York Times Nonfiction Best Seller list in 1985.

See also

 New York Times Fiction Best Sellers of 1985
 1985 in literature
 Lists of The New York Times Nonfiction Best Sellers
 Publishers Weekly list of bestselling novels in the United States in the 1980s

References

1985
.
1985 in the United States